The Mob Rules Tour, by the English rock group Black Sabbath, began on 15 November 1981 in Quebec City and ended on 31 August 1982 in Hoffman Estates, Illinois.

Background
A cross was used in the stage production.

"The album is more rockier than we've done before," observed guitarist Tony Iommi, "and the show is far more uptempo that it has been before – and a lot more involved… with stage presentation and effects and stuff like that. We enjoy it, the whole thing – we're very happy with the situation at the moment."

Recordings from the tour spawned the Live Evil album.

Personnel
 Ronnie James Dio – Vocals
 Tony Iommi – Guitar
 Geezer Butler – Bass
 Vinny Appice – Drums and percussion

Setlist

Songs played overall
"E5150" [Audio intro]
"Neon Knights"
"N.I.B."
"Children of the Sea"
"Country Girl"
"Turn Up the Night"
"Voodoo"
"Black Sabbath"
"War Pigs"
"Slipping Away"
Vinny Appice drum solo
"Iron Man"
"Falling Off the Edge of the World"
"The Mob Rules"
"Heaven and Hell" and Tony Iommi guitar solo
"The Sign of the Southern Cross" and "Heaven & Hell" [Reprise]
"Paranoid" [First encore]
"Children of the Grave" [Final encore]
"Fluff" [Audio outro]

Typical setlist
"E5150" [Audio intro]
"Neon Knights"
"N.I.B."
"Children of the Sea"
"Voodoo"
"Black Sabbath"
"War Pigs"
Vinny Appice drum solo
"Iron Man"
"The Mob Rules"
"Heaven & Hell" and Tony Iommi guitar solo
"The Sign of the Southern Cross" and "Heaven & Hell" [Reprise]
"Paranoid" [First encore]
"Children of the Grave" [Final encore]
"Fluff" [Audio outro]

Tour dates

References 

1981 concert tours
1982 concert tours
Black Sabbath concert tours